The World U23 Wrestling Championships are the Amateur Wrestling World Championship for athletes under 23 years old and is organized by United World Wrestling. The tournament began in 2017.

Editions

 2020 U23 World Wrestling Championships in Tampere, Finland not held due to the COVID-19 pandemic.

Team Rankings

Medals (2017 - 2022)
As of the 2022 U23 World Wrestling Championships.

See also

 List of Cadet, Junior, Espoir and U-23 World Champions in men's Greco-Roman wrestling
 List of Cadet, Junior, and Espoir World Champions in men's freestyle wrestling
 World Junior Wrestling Championships
 List of World Championships medalists in wrestling (freestyle)
 List of World Championships medalists in wrestling (Greco-Roman)
 List of World Championships medalists in wrestling (women)
 List of World and Olympic Champions in Greco-Roman wrestling
 List of World and Olympic Champions in men's freestyle wrestling
 Wrestling World Cup
 World Wrestling Championships
 World Wrestling Clubs Cup
 World Beach Wrestling Championships

References
 United World Wrestling Database
 2017 Results Book
 2018 Results Book
 2019 Results Book
 2021 Results Book
 2022 Results Book 
 2017
 2018
 2019
 2021
 2022

 
Wrestling competitions
Wrestling
Under-23 sports competitions
World youth sports competitions
Recurring sporting events established in 2017